The following is a list of notable deaths in August 1991.

Entries for each day are listed alphabetically by surname. A typical entry lists information in the following sequence:
 Name, age, country of citizenship at birth, subsequent country of citizenship (if applicable), reason for notability, cause of death (if known), and reference.

August 1991

1
Helen Page Camp, 60, American actress (The Fresh Prince of Bel-Air), stroke.
Carmine Fatico, 81, American mobster and caporegime in the Gambino crime family.
John Gilchrist, 51, Scottish football player.
Yusuf Idris, 64, Egyptian playwright and novelist, heart attack.
Chris Short, 53, American baseball player, complications from a brain aneurysm.
Vlado Šegrt, 83, Yugoslav and Bosnian partisan, politician and political commissar.

2
Marcel Blistène, 80, French film director.
Bob Perina, 70, American gridiron football player.
Jack Sensenbrenner, 88, American politician.
Boris Ugarov, 69, Soviet painter.
John Francis Whealon, 70, American Roman Catholic archbishop.

3
Georg Krog, 76, Norwegian Olympic speed skater and lawyer.
Louise Hammond Raymond, 104, American tennis player.
Armando Contreras Reyes, 72, Chilean football player.
Cornelius V. S. Roosevelt, 75, American World War II veteran and grandson of president Theodore Roosevelt.
Ali Sabri, 70, Egyptian politician, prime minister (1961–1968) and vice-president (1965–1968), heart attack.
Károly Sós, 82, Hungarian football player and manager.

4
Dean Burch, 63, American lawyer and lobbyist, bladder cancer.
Don DaGradi, 80,  American animator (Peter Pan) and screenwriter (Mary Poppins, Lady and the Tramp).
Yevgeny Dragunov, 71, Soviet weapon designer (SVD-63 rifle).
Jeri Southern, 64, American singer, heart attack.
Emil Tschakarow, 43, Bulgarian conductor.
Nikiforos Vrettakos, 79, Greek writer.
Sammy White, 64, American baseball player.

5
Paul Brown, 82, American football coach (Cleveland Browns), pneumonia.
Murray Golden, 78, American television director and producer (Death Valley Days, The Twilight Zone, Medical Center).
Sōichirō Honda, 84, Japanese engineer and businessman (Honda), liver failure.
Gaston Litaize, 81, French organist and composer.
Lena Mukhina, 66, Russian diarist during the Siege of Leningrad.

6
Shapour Bakhtiar, 77, Iranian politician, prime minister (1979), murdered.
Roland Michener, 91, Canadian politician, governor general (1967–1974).
Arthur Pentelow, 67, English actor (Emmerdale, Coronation Street, Privilege), heart attack.
Harry Reasoner, 68, American journalist and commentator (60 Minutes), brain aneurysm.
Max Rostal, 86, Austrian-British violinist.
Joe Verdeur, 65, American competition swimmer, Olympic champion, and world record-holder.

7
Jimmy Cooney, 96, American baseball player.
Kalina Jędrusik, 60, Polish singer and actress, asthma.
Charles Manring, 61, American Olympic rower (1952).
William James Te Wehi Taitoko, 42, New Zealand comedian, heart failure.
Bai Xiangguo, 73, Chinese military officer and politician.

8
András Benkei, 67, Hungarian politician.
Julissa Gomez, 18, American gymnast and quadriplegic, infection.
Daniel Haberman, 58, American poet, translator and graphic designer, lymphoma.
Gladys Hulette, 95, American silent film actress.
James Irwin, 61, American astronaut (Apollo 15), heart attack.
Ivan Kozhedub, 71, Soviet flying ace during World War II, heart attack.
Nicholas Poppe, 94, Russian-American linguist.
Mitsuko Yoshikawa, 90, Japanese actress, heart attack.
Walter Zeman, 64, Austrian football goalkeeper.

9
Richard Lee Armstrong, 54, American-Canadian scientist, liver cancer.
Cella Delavrancea, 103, Romanian pianist.
Schubert Gambetta, 71, Uruguayan football player.
Corrie Hartong, 85, Dutch choreographer.
Richard Löwenthal, 83, German journalist and academic.
Hank Majeski, 74, American baseball player and coach, cancer.

10
John Abt, 87,  American lawyer and communist politician
Herbert Blankenhorn, 86, German diplomat.
Ellen Braumüller, 80, German Olympic track and field athlete (1932).
Danny Casolaro, 44, American writer, suicide by exsanguination.
Hans Jakob Polotsky, 85, Israeli linguist.
Jessie Robins, 86, English actress.
Buster Smith, 86, American saxophonist, heart attack.

11
Alfred Dompert, 76, German Olympic runner (1936).
J. D. McDuffie, 52, American racing driver, racing accident.
Alan Spenner, 43, English bass player, heart attack.
Wilhelm Utermann, 78, German film producer.
Helmut Walcha, 83, German organist.

12
Edward George Bowen, 80, Welsh physicist and inventor of radar.
Chuck Chuckovits, 79, American basketball player.
Lin Fengmian, 90, Chinese painter.
William D. Gordon, 73, American screenwriter and actor, lung cancer.
Édson Campos Martins, 61, Brazilian football player.
Hans Weigel, 83, Austrian writer and theater critic.

13
Lucia Peka, 79, Latvian-American artist.
James Roosevelt, 83, American politician, member of the U.S. House of Representatives (1955–1965), stroke.
Jack Ryan, 64, American toy designer (Barbie, Hot Wheels), suicide by gunshot.
Richard A. Snelling, 64, American businessman and politician, heart attack.
John Sommerfield, 83, British writer and left-wing activist.
Kazuo Yamada, 78, Japanese conductor and composer.

14
Waldemar Christoffer Brøgger, 79, Norwegian novelist, journalist, and translator.
Stanley Chambers, 80, British cyclist and Olympic silver medalist.
Alberto Crespo, 71, Argentine racing driver.
Taslim Olawale Elias, 76, Nigerian jurist.
Douglas Kiker, 61, American author, heart attack.
Ludwig Landgrebe, 89, Austrian phenomenologist and professor of philosophy.

15
Eduardo Herrera Bueno, 77, Spanish football player.
Ken Gunn, 82, Scottish football player.
Ali Abu Nuwar, 67, Jordanian Army officer.
Marietta Peabody Tree, 74, American political reporter, breast cancer.
Jack Twyford, 82, Australian football player.

16
Charles Garry, 82, American civil rights lawyer, stroke.
C. Achutha Menon, 78, Indian politician, heart attack.
Bruno Nicolai, 65, Italian film music composer and orchestra director.
Johannes Wiese, 76, German Luftwaffe fighter ace during World War II.
Luigi Zampa, 86, Italian film director.

17
Don Dubbins, 63, American actor, cancer.
Lorna Hill, 89, English children's author.
Dieter König, 60, German motorboat racer.
Mervyn Nelson, 76, American actor and producer.
Marguerite Williams, 95, American geologist.

18
Luís Lindley Cintra, 66, Portuguese philologist and linguist.
David Gale, 54, British actor, complications from surgery.
Rick Griffin, 47, American artist and cartoonist, traffic collision.
Patrick Joseph Kelly, 96, Scottish-Nigerian Roman Catholic prelate.
Porter Lainhart, 83, American football player.
Les McDowall, 78, Scottish football player.
Chiang Sheng, 40, Taiwanese martial arts actor, heart attack.
Vaughn Shoemaker, 89, American cartoonist, cancer.

19
Oliver Drake, 88, American filmmaker.
Xan Fielding, 72, British author, journalist and traveller.
Hans van der Laan, 86, Dutch architect and monk.
Richard Maltby, 77, American musician.
Henri van Schaik, 92, Dutch horse rider and Olympic medalist.

20
Herbert Ferber, 85, American visual artist.
Kalman Kahana, 81, Israeli politician and journalist.
Gopinath Mohanty, 77, Indian writer and novelist.
José Luis Sagi-Vela, 46, Spanish basketball player.
Harley Orrin Staggers, 84, American politician.
Mihály Teleki, 95, Hungarian politician.

21
Mikhail Agursky, 58, Russian sovietologist, cybernetic, dissident, and historian.
Nick DeCarbo, 81, American gridiron football player.
Wolfgang Hildesheimer, 74, German author.
Eugen Jebeleanu, 80, Romanian poet, journalist and scholar.
Paul Miller, 84, American journalist and newspaper executive, pneumonia.
Rajaram Shastri, 87, Indian educationist.
Oswald von Nell-Breuning, 101, German theologian.
Richard Wilson, 75, American film director, pancreatic cancer.

22
Chan Coulter, 89, American track and field athlete and Olympian.
Colleen Dewhurst, 67, Canadian-American actress, cervical cancer.
Gottfried E. Noether, 76, German-American mathematician.
Boris Pugo, 54, Soviet politician, suicide by gunshot.

23
George Dixon, 90, American rugby union player.
Wilhelm Hahnemann, 77, Austrian-German football player.
Innes Lloyd, 65, Welsh television producer.
Ágnes Nemes Nagy, 69, Hungarian poet, writer, and educator.
Florence Barbara Seibert, 93, American biochemist.
Mildred Trotter, 92, American forensic anthropology pioneer.

24
Sergey Akhromeyev, 68, Soviet M\marshal, suicide by gunshot.
Dick Beddoes, 65, Canadian sports journalist, liver cancer.
Reynold Brown, 73, American realist artist.
Abel Kiviat, 99, American Olympic runner (1912), prostate cancer.
Tony Martínez, 51, Cuban-American baseball player.
Åge Ramberg, 69, Norwegian politician.
Vivian Vachon, 40, Canadian professional wrestler and singer, traffic collision.
Beb Vuyk, 86, Dutch writer.

25
Niven Busch, 88, American novelist and screenwriter (The Postman Always Rings Twice), congestive heart failure.
Kunnenkeril K. Jacob, 87, Indian educationist.
Shigeyoshi Matsumae, 89, Japanese engineer.
Eddie Phillipson, 80, English cricket player.
Yoshiko Shibaki, 77, Japanese writer of short stories and novels.

26
Nikolay Kruchina, 63, Soviet communist official, suicide.
Ron Livingstone, 65, American basketball player.
John Petts, 77, British artist.
Vera Stroyeva, 87, Soviet film director and screenwriter.
Willie Thornton, 71, Scottish football player.

27
Pierre Bousquet, 71, French journalist and far-right politician.
Gordon Heath, 72, American actor (The Emperor Jones, Animal Farm).
Martín Karadagian, 69, Argentine professional wrestler and actor, diabetes.
Toto Koopman, 82, Dutch model and spy.
Gioacchino Muccin, 91, Italian Roman Catholic prelate.
Mike Naumenko, 36, Soviet singer, cerebral hemorrhage.
Patriarch German of Serbia, 92, Serbian Orthodox patriarch (1958–1990).
Teddy Stauffer, 82, Swiss bandleader, entertainer, and restaurateur.
Piet van Boxtel, 88, Dutch football player.

28
Pierre Guillaumat, 82, French politician.
Emiliano Piedra, 60, Spanish film producer, cancer.
Alekos Sakellarios, 77, Greek writer and a director.
Nicholas Schaffner, 38, American author, journalist, and singer-songwriter, AIDS-related complications.
Vince Taylor, 52, English rock and roll singer ("Brand New Cadillac"), lung cancer.

29
Dallas Adams, 44, English actor, AIDS.
Ivan Bodin, 68, Swedish football player.
Alick Buchanan-Smith, 59, Scottish politician.
Dixie Dunbar, 72, American actress and singer.
Libero Grassi, 67, Italian clothing manufacturer, murdered.

30
Joyce Ackroyd, 72, Australian academic.
Adão Nunes Dornelles, 68, Brazilian football player.
Cyril Knowles, 47, English footballer, brain cancer.
Jean Tinguely, 66, Swiss sculptor, heart failure.
Alan Wheatley, 84, English actor, heart attack.
Danny Wheelahan, 88, Australian football player.

31
Ed Buchanan, 57, Canadian football player, ALS.
Andrzej Gąsienica Daniel, 59, Polish ski jumper and Olympian.
Gerry Davis, 61, British television writer (Doctor Who).
Cliff Lumsdon, 60, Canadian world champion marathon swimmer.
Siti Sukaptinah Sunaryo Mangunpuspito, 83, Indonesian women's rights activist and politician.
Phoolchandra Shastri, 90, Indian jain scholar, writer, and social reformer.

References 

1991-08
 08